Waters Normal Institute, originally Winton Academy and then Chosen Academy before becoming Calvin S. Brown School, was a school in Winton, North Carolina. Winton Academy was incorporated as a "colored school" March 7, 1887, by the North Carolina General Assembly. It had 15 trustees. The University of Virginia has a photograph of the school building and a couple of individuals outside.

Calvin Scott Brown served as the school's principal until his death in 1936. The school's C. S. Brown School Auditorium is listed on the National Register of Historic Places.

References

External links 

Defunct schools in North Carolina